The large false serotine (Hesperoptenus tomesi) is a species of vesper bat. It is found only in Malaysia.

References

Hesperoptenus
Bats of Malaysia
Endemic fauna of Malaysia
Vulnerable fauna of Asia
Mammals described in 1905
Taxonomy articles created by Polbot
Taxa named by Oldfield Thomas